There are many types of trains in Seoul but they are usually similar to each other. Typically, train cars have four doors on each side. In between the doors are rows of either cushioned or non-cushioned seats for 7 people, except for the outer ends of each wagon where there are smaller rows of seats for 3 people, marked for the use by the elderly, disabled passengers, and pregnant women.

This list focuses primarily on trains that run on the 9 urban subway lines in Seoul, the wide-area commuter rail lines integrated into the Seoul Metropolitan Subway, and the AREX airport railroad. The list does not, however, include rolling stock used on the Incheon Subway and light metro systems such as the U Line or EverLine.

Features

Emergency procedures 

Each train has at least one fire extinguisher and options for opening the door in an emergency. A SOS phone is placed in most cars operated by the Seoul Metropolitan Rapid Transit Corporation, and all new rolling stock.

Help for English Speakers 

All trains in Seoul have both English and Korean announcements regarding each train stop. In addition, a map displays their names in both Korean and Latin characters. Many trains also have a LED display above a door or in the middle of the train car that displays information in Korean and English, though many side signs have been removed from trains due to their reduced visibility with the advent of platform screen doors. Some of the newest trains feature LCD screens above the doors or the middle of the train that display short commercials and station information.

Fleet

Seoul Metro & Korail 
All cars are 19.6 meters in length, 3.12 meters in width, and 3.8 meters in height. Newer trains operated by Seoul Metro are usually given the same number as the trains they are intended to replace.

All trains on Lines 5-8 are equipped with an ATO (Automatic Train Operation) systems. However, there is always a driver on board in case of a failure in the ATO system.

Active (built before 2000)

Active (built after 2000) 
All trains use VVVF inverter-based propulsion systems. Older trains generally use GTOs, while newer trains generally use IGBTs.

Retired

Seoul Metro Line 9 Corporation (Metro 9) 
All trains on Line 9 are six cars long, although many were initially built with four cars.

Seoul Metro (Line 9 Corporation) 9000-series
 First batch (2008) – trains 01~24
 Newer cars for extending trains to six cars built in 2018.
 Second batch (2011) – trains 25~36
 Newer cars for extending trains to six cars built in 2017.
 Third batch (2016) – trains 37-45
 Fourth batch (TBD)

NeoTrans Co. Ltd. 
Shinbundang Line D000-series (Hyundai Rotem):
 First batch (2010-2011): D001~D012
 Second batch (2014-2015): D013~D020

These trains are controlled by ATO; they are controlled by a computer system on board the train.

Korail Airport Railroad Co., Ltd. 
 AREX 1000 series
 VVVF inverter controlled electric car
 AREX 2000 series
 VVVF inverter controlled electric car

See also 
 Korail
 Seoul Metropolitan Subway
 Seoul Metro
 Seoul Metropolitan Rapid Transit Corporation
 Seoul Metro Line 9 Corporation

Notes

References

Electric multiple units of South Korea
Seoul Metropolitan Subway
Lists of rolling stock